Kebun Baru also known as Nee Soon South is a precinct within Ang Mo Kio, Singapore. It is located in the west of Ang Mo Kio and bounded by Mayflower district and Bishan - Ang Mo Kio Park. The current Member of Parliament (MP) for this precinct is Henry Kwek (Kebun Baru SMC). Former MP includes Prime Minister Lee Hsien Loong  when the precinct is in the Teck Ghee ward of Ang Mo Kio GRC.

It is served by the Mayflower MRT station along the Thomson-East Coast MRT Line in 2021.

Etymology
Kebun Baru (new garden in Malay) is often seen as a tranquil district with a town park and consists of both public housing and private housing. The name is adapted from a former Kampong Kebun Baharu.

Amenities and landmarks
 Ang Mo Kio Joint Temple
 Bishan - Ang Mo Kio Park
 Kebun Baru Birdsinging Club
 Kebun Baru Community Club
 Kebun Baru Market and Food Centre
 Mayflower Market and Food Centre

References

Places in Singapore
North Region, Singapore
Ang Mo Kio